Simon Bamford is an English film, television and stage actor. He is well known for playing the Butterball Cenobite in Hellraiser in 1987 and its sequel Hellbound: Hellraiser II in 1988.

Career
Simon graduated from Mountview Academy of Theatre Arts in 1981. At the Young Vic in London, he played Ernst Robel in Spring Awakening, At the Chichester Festival Theatre he played opposite Nicholas Parsons and Ruthie Henshall as 'Gabby' in Follow the Star, In Cairo and Bucharest he performed in The Complete Works of William Shakespeare (Abridged) and played Roy in Neville's Island. He played the Butterball Cenobite in the first two Hellraiser films. He also created and played the role of Ohnaka in Clive Barker's holocaust film Nightbreed. In 2009, he played Derek in Book of Blood for Matador Pictures, Gary in Dead of the Nite shot in Cardiff and is currently filming the season finale to Dark Ditties presents ‘Stained’ and the anthology film Mosaic. On television, he can be seen in the SKY TV 'Better Effect' commercials. In 2000, he won actor of the year award for his portrayal of Pip in Great Expectations at the Vasa Theatre in Stockholm, and has also designed and directed several international tours including The Big Day in Sofia, Qatar and Dubai as well as Educating Rita in Kuala Lumpur. In 2004 he took a production of Shirley Valentine to Karachi to help raise money for a new school.

Other work
He has been a theatre reviewer for The Stage newspaper since 2006 and is guest speaker at film conventions in Bottrop, Münster and London.

Filmography
Hellraiser (1987) - Butterball Cenobite
Hellbound: Hellraiser II (1988) - Butterball Cenobite
Nightbreed (1990) - Ohnaka
Book of Blood (2009) - Derek
Dead of the Nite (2012) - Gary
Riley (2013) - The Man
Parson & Son (2013) - Mr Parson 
The 4th Reich (2013) - Unterscarfuhrer Kraus
Starfish (2016) - Senior Consultant
You're So Cool, Brewster: The Story of Fright Night (2016, documentary; in-character host) - Peter Vincent
Dark Ditties presents The Offer (2017) Jonathon Brook Davies 
Dark Ditties presents Mrs Wiltshire (2018) Alison Wiltshire & Jonathon Brook Davies 
Dark Ditties presents Finders Keepers (2018) Mr Wainwright 
Dark Ditties presents The Witching Hour (2019) - Leslie Topper 
The Haunting of Margam Castle (2020) - Witchfinder General 
14 Ghosts - (2021) Mr Peindre

Self
Hellraiser: Resurrection (2000)(V) -Himself
Hellbound: Hellraiser II - Lost in the Labyrinth (2000)(V) -Himself
Demons to Others: The making of 'Hellraiser: Prophecy''' (2007) -Himself

Archive FootageBoogeyman: The Killer Compilation'' (2001)(V) -Butterball Cenobite ('Hellraiser')

See also
Cenobite

References

External links

 simonbamford.online

Living people
English male film actors
English male television actors
People from Peterborough
Year of birth missing (living people)